The 1970 Football Championship of Ukrainian SSR was the 40th season of association football competition of the Ukrainian SSR, which was part of the Second Group of Soviet Class A in Zone 1. It was the eighth and last season in the Second Group of Soviet Class A. 

The season started on 11 April 1970.

The 1970 Football Championship of Ukrainian SSR was won by FC Metalurh Zaporizhia.

Reorganization
In 1970–1971 the Soviet football league structure went through reformation. The Soviet Class A introduced an extra tier expanding from two to three in total. To the previous First and Second groups, there was introduced Higher (or Top) group. With this, many clubs that previously competed at the second tier (Second Group) were relegated to lower third tier (Second Group). Because of that, many clubs also moved two tiers either up the league's ladder.

Teams

Location map

Relegated teams
18 clubs were relegated from the 1969 Second Group (Class A).

 FC Metalurh Zaporizhia
 SC Tavriya Simferopol
 FC Avtomobilist Zhytomyr
 FC Sudnobudivnyk Mykolaiv
 FC Azovets Zhdanov
 FC Zirka Kirovohrad
 FC Bukovyna Chernivtsi
 FC Lokomotyv Kherson
 FC Desna Chernihiv
 FC Shakhtar Horlivka
 FC Budivelnyk Poltava
 SKA Lviv
 FC Kryvbas Kryvyi Rih
 FC Spartak Brest
 FC Avanhard Ternopil
 FC Neman Grodno
 FC Baltika Kaliningrad
 SKA Odessa

Promoted teams
All four teams technically were never promoted as they stayed at the third tier. Three clubs were moved from the 1969 Ukrainian Class B, one more from the 1969 Russian Class B, Zone 1.
 FC Spartak Ivano-Frankivsk
 FC Shakhtar Kadiivka
 FC Spartak Sumy
 FC Gomselmash Gomel

Relocated and renamed teams
 none

Final standings

Top goalscorers
The following were the top goalscorers.

See also
 Soviet Second League

Notes

References

External links
 1970 season regulations.  Luhansk football portal
 1970 Soviet Second League, Zone 1 (Ukrainian SSR football championship). Luhansk football portal
 1971 Soviet championships (all leagues) at helmsoccer.narod.ru
 Class "A" – Druha Hrupa (Zone 1) – 1970 (Клас "А" - Друга група (1 зона) - 1970). ukr-football.org

1970
3
Soviet
Soviet
football
Football Championship of the Ukrainian SSR